Megaprosopini is a tribe of bristle flies in the family Tachinidae. There are at least two genera and about five described species in Megaprosopini.

Genera
These two genera belong to the tribe Megaprosopini:
 Megaprosopus Macquart, 1844
 Microphthalma Macquart, 1844

References

Further reading

External links

 
 
 

Tachininae